Ştiinţa Bacău, is a Romanian women's volleyball club based in Bacău, that competes in the CEV Cup.

Honours

National competitions
  Romanian Championship: 4
1998, 2005, 2013, 2014

  Romanian Cup: 5
2005, 2006, 2013, 2014, 2015

Team

Current squad 2020-2021 
  Georgiana Faleș
  Lorena Ciocian
  Alexandra Ciucu
  Carmen-Ioana Dițu
  Laura Pihlajamäki
  Slavina Koleva
  Kinga Kasprzak
  Magdalena Dzikowicz

See also
 Romania women's national volleyball team

External links 
Official Facebook page
CEV profile

Romanian volleyball clubs
Sport in Bacău
1966 establishments in Romania
Volleyball clubs established in 1966